ITV Box Office was a pay-per-view channel from ITV plc launched in February 2017, and ceased operations in January 2020. The channel was available in HD-only on Sky, and events were also available on demand only on Virgin Media (UK) and TVPlayer. It was the only ITV channel that was broadcast in Ireland on Sky.

History
In December 2016 ITV announced that it had signed a deal to show Chris Eubank Jr.'s latest fight against Renold Quinlan and that it would be a pay-per-view event. The channel launched when the fight took place on 4 February 2017. Eubank Jr. headlined for the second time on the Box Office platform on 15 July 2017 against former world champion Arthur Abraham.

In September 2017, it was announced that ITV had purchased the rights to show the World Boxing Super Series tournament, which would allow them to show 14 different fights from September 2017 until the final in September 2018. It was revealed that fights involving George Groves or Eubank Jr. would be shown live on the Box Office platform, as well as the final.

At the end of 2018, ITV and Al Haymon’s Premier Boxing Champions signed a landmark UK boxing partnership. As part of the three-year agreement, at least 15 events will be televised on ITV Box Office, with some being shown on the free-to-air ITV4. Haymon's PBC media rights portfolio currently features more than 160 fighters, including Filipino icon Manny Pacquiao, both Americans Errol Spence Jr and heavyweight world champion Deontay Wilder.

In May 2019, ITV Box Office presented its first professional wrestling event when it aired All Elite Wrestling's inaugural Double or Nothing show.

Closure 
On 24 January 2020 the following message was posted on the ITV Box Office web page:
'The ITV Box Office service has ceased as of 24 January 2020. There are no further plans to show any future events on this channel.'

Past rights 

 World Boxing Super Series (2017-18 only, from the 2018-19 semi-finals the rights moved to Sky Sports Box Office)
 Premier Boxing Champions (also available on Sky Sports, from the fourth quarter of 2019 the rights moved to BoxNation and Premier Sports)
 All Elite Wrestling pay-per-views, commencing with Double or Nothing

References

External links
ITV Boxing

2017 establishments in the United Kingdom
2020 disestablishments in the United Kingdom
Defunct television channels in the United Kingdom
ITV (TV network)
ITV television channels
Pay-per-view television channels in the United Kingdom
Sports television channels in the United Kingdom
Sports television in the United Kingdom
Television channels and stations established in 2017
Television channels and stations disestablished in 2020